Eva is an unincorporated community in Texas County, Oklahoma, United States. It is located along State Highway 95, approximately two miles north of U.S. Route 412.

The Beaver, Meade and Englewood Railroad built through Eva by the end of 1930.  That line was abandoned in 1972, but the Eva Woodframe Grain Elevator built along its tracks remains and is on the National Register of Historic Places listings in Texas County, Oklahoma.

See also
 National Register of Historic Places listings in Texas County, Oklahoma

References

Unincorporated communities in Texas County, Oklahoma
Unincorporated communities in Oklahoma
Oklahoma Panhandle